Cugy FR railway station is a railway station in the municipality of Cugy, in the Swiss canton of Fribourg. It is an intermediate stop on the standard gauge Fribourg–Yverdon line of Swiss Federal Railways.

Services
The following services stop at Cugy FR:

References

External links 
 
 

Railway stations in the canton of Fribourg
Swiss Federal Railways stations